Vietic peoples refers to a group of ethnic groups of Southeast Asia.

Geographic distribution
The Vietic peoples are aboriginal to northern Vietnam, Laos and surrounding areas, mostly in northern Annamite mountains, although they can also be found in Thailand, Cambodia and China.

Origin

The proto-Vietic peoples are believed to have migrated by land from China to Laos and Vietnam through the Mekong, where they had settled for at least 4,500 years. Although there is no good estimate, paleolithic human sites around the modern Vietic villages in Laos and Nghe An are dated 2,500 to 2,000 BC, indicates that perhaps they were. They were parts of the larger proto-Austroasiatic peoples, who inhabited widely on neolithic mainland Southeast Asia. A human fossil site of these hunter-gatherers excavated in a cave at Pha Phen, 12 kilometres south of Lak Sao, Bolikhamsai Province is dated to 6190 BP (4190 BC). The Katuic people separated from Vieto-Katuic to be an independent group around 1,000 BC.

Nghệ An is regarded in Vietnam as the "Vietic homeland" after the Austroasiatic exodus from Yunnan (also believed to be a tribute to North Vietnamese leader Ho Chi Minh's birthplace). Anthropologists however considered the large area along the Northern Annamites Mountains from Nghệ An to Quảng Bình Province in Vietnam, Bolikhamsai to Khammouane Province in Laos as the traditional Vietic homeland, due to high amount of diversity of archaic Vietic groups and languages live in the region. not in the Red River Delta, which had been originally inhabited by Tai speakers However, archaeogenetics demonstrated that before the Đông Sơn period, the Red River Delta's inhabitants were predominantly Austroasiatic: genetic data from Phùng Nguyên culture's Mán Bạc burial site (dated to 1,800 BCE, thus predating Proto-Vietic, which is dated to 1,000 BCE) have close proximity to modern Austroasiatic speakers; meanwhile, "mixed genetics" from Đông Sơn culture's Núi Nấp site showed affinity to "Dai from China, Tai-Kadai speakers from Thailand, and Austroasiatic speakers from Vietnam, including the Việt"; Therefore, "[t]he likely spread of Vietic was southward from the [Red River Delta], not northward. Accounting for southern diversity will require alternative explanations."

History
The Northern groups of the Vietics, resided in the norde-extremê Annamites (part of ancient Jiaozhi and Jiuzhen), known as the Viet-Muong, had intensively contacts and interactions with the Tai people and Sinitic colonists from the north during the thousand years of Chinese rule. Based on linguistic evidence and historical records, anthropologists believe that the Viet-Muong eventually separated into two independent groups of Vietnamese and Muong must be no earlier or later than seventh to tenth century (Tang dynasty).

The remaining, isolating tribes of the Vietics of the Laotian side of the Annamites mountains are still intact and uncharmed of any civilizations, and stayed out of the region politics, despite numerous contests between the Khmer, the Vietnamese, and the Chinese over the region from 722 to mid-12th century. The Siamese launched several catastrophic raids onto Laotian Vietic areas from 1826 to 1860 as part of their punitory expeditions on the Vientiane Kingdom and greatly depopulated many Vietic villages. During late 19th century, their homeland area of Khammouane (now Khamkeut District, Bolikhamsai Province and Nakai-Nam Theun National Park) seen the massive arrival of Tai-speaking and Hmong-speaking groups from Houaphanh and Nghệ An, which included many former Zhuang warriors fleeing the Taiping rebellion in China, social upheavals and unrest in Vietnam, and Khmu Ho-Chueng war in Northern Laos. The new settlers immediately dominated the indigenous Vietic villagers, sometimes hired them as labors. Some of Vietic groups were labeled as Puak to indicate their vassalage, or simply called as Kha by the Tais. Originally Laotian Vietic groups that now speak Tai and Lao languages, for example, the Bo, were perhaps results of the Taization process, the willingness of adaptation of language, and culture of the dominant outnumbering group by minority groups, explained by a Tai Khang leader in Bolikhamsai: "We are Lao Loum; before we were Kha, but we decided to adopt Lao language and became Lao Loum, and now we have forgotten our Kha language." Anthropologists noted that similar patterns also happened to many other Mon-Khmer speaking peoples in surrounding places. 

The history of the Southeast Vietics (Chutic) is lesser known, especially the Ruc. They were encountered in 1959 by Vietnamese soldiers in Sơn Đoòng Cave, Quảng Bình Province as hundred naked tribesmen dwelling in the cave. Since then, Chutic groups included the Ruc, have been resettled by the North Vietnamese government in Cu Nhái, Quảng Bình. However, new reports say that one third of the Ruc population have returned to the forest, dwelling in valleys that stand 2,000 meters above the sea lever, and many suffered from jungle malaria. The Ruc remains as today world's most isolating and mysterious tribe.

Classification and language
There are currently existing 25 Vietic ethnic groups, marvelously ranging from nation-state to nomadic foragers, hill-paddy cultivators, mostly  inhabiting on a hilly, mountainous landmass stretching from the Bolikhamsai Province to Khammouane Province in Laos; Nghệ An to Quảng Bình Province in Vietnam, heavily concentrating in Khamkhuet and Nakai Valley.

Their languages are classified to belong to the Vietic language family, which is a branch of the Austro-Asiatic language family.

 Northern Vietic (Viet-Muong): Vietnamese, Muong, Nguồn people.
 Northwest Vietic: Thổ (Tuom, Liha, Phong).
 West Vietic: Thavueng (Aloe, Ahao, Ahlao).
 Southeast Vietic (Chutic): Chứt (Rục, Mày, Arem, Mã Liềng, Sách, Salang).
 Southwest Vietic: Bo, Arao, Atel, Atop, Kaleung, Maleng, Pakatan, Themarou, Kri, Phoong, Mlengbrou. The Bo and the Kaleung are perhaps Vietic groups that recently switched to Tai languages.

Concerns on NT2 Project impact
Concerns on environmental and anthropological impacts that potential cause consequences to the Laotian Vietic peoples in the Nakai-Nam Theum 2 Watershed National Protected Area (NPA) and Peripheral Impact Zone (PIZ) began to grow when the permission of constructing the reservoir Nam Theun 2 Dam (NT2 Project) on the Nam Theun, Nam Noy and Nam Nyang Rivers, basically inside the Nakai-Nam Theun National Park and Nakai valley, areas where indigenous West and Southwest Vietic ethnic groups had been inhabiting for thousand years, was opened in 1997. The NT2 Project was a BOT dam which was mainly fundraised by the World Bank and the Asian Development Bank (ADB), they would be handed to the Laotian government. The project's mismanagement of indigenous resettling left a traumatic impact on the vulnerable Vietic villagers and they had to be relocated far away from their homeland. Most concerns raised on Vietic type I ethnic groups who themselves heavily rely on nomadic lifestyle in the forests, due to the hydroelectric project's deforestation, and many tribes do not wish to engage and practice permanent sedentary agriculture in new allocated settlements. Plans to restore the livelihoods of villagers on the Nakai Plateau and along the Xe Bang Fai River have yet to be ratified. According to a POE (International Panel of Environmental and Social Experts) report in 2015, the percentage of Vietic villagers among new settlements dropped from 67.4% to 35% within 8 years, while Tai-speaking groups practically and economically dominating them. Other concerns such as government's integrated different Vietic groups with Tai and Hmong villages, and grouping smaller minorities, where Vietic labors were not only exploited by other groups in the villages but also discriminated in term of livelihood opportunities and healthcare. 

A safeguard recommendation to the WB in 2004 said: OD 4.20 [the WB safeguard on Indigenous Peoples] emphasizes participatory processes, requiring development of minority plans “based on consideration of the options preferred by the indigenous peoples affected by the project.” It also emphasizes the importance of “ensuring genuine representation” (ibid) among people whose “social and economic status restricts their capacity to assert their interests and rights” (Para. 2). To achieve policy objectives regarding the Vietic Type I people, special measures should be devised for their protection, and to ensure that they are afforded opportunities to participate in the process of devising culturally appropriate benefits... Specific arrangements for monitoring project-related impacts on Vietic Type I groups should be provided. Quote – Unquote (Gibson/WB BTOR 2004). The recommendation was unfortunately ignored. 

The population of many Vietic ethnic groups in the region has been drastically decreased in recent years. The POE report found that four extreme vulnerable Vietic groups in the NPA and PIZ that are at risk of being extinct by the early 21st century: the Atel (16+), the Themarou (30+), the Mlengbrou (9), and the Ahoe. Among them, the Atel, the Themarou, and the Mlengbrou were previously nomadic hunter-gatherers, are not willing to adopt and practice the new sedentary lifestyle and intensive agriculture following government resettling program for ethnic minorities in the 1970s and the 1980s, and are still reliant much on the forest for accommodating much of their standard of living. Those tribes' populations have been plummeting from hundred people to just few individuals during recent decades, and could not survive as unique ethnic identities without intermarrying with other Vietic groups. It is highly likely that intermarriage between various Vietic tribes have been occurred throughout the last centuries. Special measures of the EMDP would be planning to address the Vietic groups which are most at risk. As the future fate of the affected Vietic groups in Nakai Valley would be an inevitable extinction if no major action undertaken to protect and conserve, James R. Chamberlain, researcher and editor of Handbook of the Changing World Language Map, blames the government's incomprehensible action on indigenous Vietic peoples around the NT2 impacted areas that led to the trouble. Khamsone, the shaman of the Ahoe, called the NT2 project's promise a lie. The Ahoe believe that after death they will be reborn as squirrels, haunting the forests that surround the NT2 dam site, Ahoe spiritual territory.

Society
The isolating Vietics in Laos (exclude the Vietnamese and the Muong) are generally divided by anthropologists into four categories per lifestyle:
 Vietic type I: Nomadic Hunter-gatherers (Atop, Atel, Makang, Thémarou, Mlengbrou, Chuet).
 Vietic type II: Recently Slash-and-burn (Arao, Malang, Maleng, T'oe, Phoong–lower Noy-Pheo river).
 Vietic type III: Slash-and-burn, villages (Kri–upper Noy-Pheo river).
 Vietic type IV: Rice farmers, slash-and-burn (Ahoe, Ahao, Ahlao, Liha, Toum, Phong, Pakatan).

References

Works cited

External links 
 https://link.springer.com/referenceworkentry/10.1007%2F978-3-030-02438-3_17 Endangered Vietic nomads in Laos
 http://sealang.net/mk/vietic.htm Vietic languages in SEALANG Mon-Khmer Languages Project

 
Ethnic groups in Laos
Ethnic groups in China
Ethnic groups in Vietnam
Ethnic groups in Thailand